Sarah Krasnostein is an American-Australian non-fiction writer.

Education 
Krasnostein completed a BA/LLB (honours) degree from the University of Melbourne in 2005. She was admitted as an attorney of the State of New York in 2006, and in 2009 she was admitted to practice law in Victoria, Australia. She worked as a lawyer in the  Victorian Department of Justice from 2007 to 2011.

She graduated with a PhD in criminal law from Monash University in 2016. Her thesis, "Pursuing Consistency: The Effect of Different Reforms on Unjustified Disparity in Individualised Sentencing Frameworks", was awarded the Mollie Holman Doctoral Medal for Law. Her research has been cited by the Victorian Court of Appeal, the Victorian Sentencing Advisory Council, and various academic journals.

Writing 
Krasnostein's first book, The Trauma Cleaner, was published in 2017. She spent four years researching the book, which is a work of narrative non-fiction about the life and work of Sandra Pankhurst. She was awarded the Victorian Prize for Literature and the Prize for Non-Fiction at the 2018 Victorian Premier's Literary Awards, as well as the Dobbie Literary Award and the Douglas Stewart Prize for Non-Fiction at the NSW Premier’s Literary Awards. For The Trauma Cleaner, Krasnostein was a finalist for the Melbourne Prize for Literature, the Walkley Book Award, the National Biography Award, and the Wellcome Book Prize (UK).

In her second book, The Believer, another work of narrative non-fiction, Krasnostein braids together the stories of six people from vastly different backgrounds. "The line between fact and fiction blurs to revelatory effect," wrote The New Yorker, "in this account of ghost hunters, death doulas, six-day creationists, U.F.O. investigators, and others who hold ideas at odds with, as the author judiciously puts it, “more accepted realities"." The Washington Post called the book, "generous and compassionate. . . . Her talent for penetrating intimate settings and eliciting personal testimony is impressive. The profiles are fascinating." For The Believer, Krasnostein was shortlisted for the 2021 Nib Literary Award.

In 2022, she was awarded Australia's Pascall Prize for Arts Criticism for her television reviews for The Saturday Paper. The judges said, “In the time of Covid, Sarah Krasnostein explored the artistic possibilities of television, as it met our desires for distraction and connection. She evoked new dramatic landscapes, as well as cultural change. There was depth of reference, a sense of formal advance, dry wit, and emotional openness.”

Works

Books 
 The Trauma Cleaner: One Woman's Extraordinary Life in Death, Decay & Disaster, Text Publishing, 2017 
 The Believer: Encounters with Love, Death & Faith, Text Publishing, 2021

Essay 

 "Not Waving, Drowning: Mental Illness and Vulnerability in Australia", Quarterly Essay No. 85, 2022

Personal 
Krasnostein is married to Australian comedian, Charlie Pickering.

References

External links 
 
 AustLit profile

Living people
Year of birth missing (living people)
Australian women non-fiction writers
Australian legal scholars
University of Melbourne alumni
Monash University alumni